Percy Watson (born 1981) is an American professional wrestler and former professional football player.

Percy Watson may also refer to:

Percy Watson (English footballer) (1869–1949), Australian rules footballer
Percy Watson (Australian footballer) (1898–1965), Australian rules footballer
Percy Watson (politician) (born 1951), American politician
Percy Watson (bowls) (1894–?), Northern Ireland lawn bowler